The Sir James Whitney School for the Deaf is a provincial school in Belleville, Ontario with residential and day programs serving elementary and secondary deaf and hard-of-hearing students.

Along with three (ECD and Robarts School for the Deaf) other provincial schools for the deaf in Ontario, it is operated by the Ministry of Education (Ontario) under Education Act of Ontario section 13 (1).

Teachers are both deaf and hearing.

Deaf student population is approximately 50 students in the senior school and 60 in the elementary school; total is 90 students.

Deaf students from Canada often attend Gallaudet University in Washington D.C. and Rochester Institute of Technology in Rochester, New York for post-secondary programs.

History 
This school is named after the former premier of Ontario, James Whitney. It has been renamed three times: The Ontario Institution for the Education of the Deaf and Dumb (1870–1912), The Ontario School for the Deaf (1913–1973) and The Sir James Whitney School for the Deaf (since 1974).

The Ontario Heritage Trust erected a plaque for the 'Ontario School for the Deaf' on the grounds of the school, now The Sir James Whitney School, 350 Dundas Street West, Belleville. "The first provincial school for deaf children, this residential institution combined elementary school subjects with vocational training when it opened in 1870. Over the years, ever-increasing enrolment promoted the steady expansion of the school's facilities and curricula."

Deaf student population timeline 
 1950-1960 - 800
 1960-1970 - 600
 1970-1980 - 400
 1980-1990 - 300-150
 1990-2000 - 150-120
 2000-2010 - 120-110
 2010-2019 - 110-90

Academic approach and languages of instruction 
The Sir James Whitney School for the Deaf uses a bilingual-bicultural approach to educating deaf and hard-of-hearing students. American Sign Language (ASL) and English are the languages of instruction.

Gallery

References

External links 
 Sir James Whitney School for the Deaf

Schools for the deaf in Canada
Schools in Ontario
Education in Belleville, Ontario